Raziq Khan (born 31 October 1979) is a cricketer who played for the United Arab Emirates national cricket team on 21 March 2013.

References

Living people
1979 births
Emirati cricketers
Pakistani expatriate sportspeople in the United Arab Emirates
21st-century Emirati people
Place of birth missing (living people)